is a town located in Kikuchi District, Kumamoto Prefecture, Japan.

As of October 1, 2016, the town has an estimated population of 33,793 and a density of 340 persons per km². The total area is 99.09 km².

The town is known for its Azalea (tsutsuji) Festival in the spring. There is a large Honda factory located near Ozu that employs people from around the world. Ozu is also known for its sweet potatoes (karaimo). The town also has one of the oldest homes in Kikuchi District that opens twice a year for tourists, a racing track, and is located on the edge of the caldera that surrounds Mount Aso.

Ozu was affected by the 2016 Kumamoto earthquakes.

References

External links

Ōzu official website 

Towns in Kumamoto Prefecture